American Factory is a 2019 American documentary film directed by Steven Bognar and Julia Reichert, about Chinese company Fuyao's factory in Moraine, a city near Dayton, Ohio, that occupies Moraine Assembly, a shuttered General Motors plant. The film had its festival premiere at the 2019 Sundance Film Festival. It is distributed by Netflix and is the first film acquired by Barack and Michelle Obama's production company, Higher Ground Productions. It won an Academy Award for Best Documentary Feature.

Overview
In post-industrial Ohio, a Chinese billionaire opens a factory in an abandoned General Motors plant, hiring two thousand Americans. Early days of hope and optimism give way to setbacks as high-tech China clashes with working-class America.

Production 
Filmed from February 2015 until the end of 2017, Reichert and Bognar were granted filming access by Fuyao at both their Ohio and Chinese plant locations. They were inspired to make this film as the events they aimed to depict were taking place in the same Moraine Assembly plant once occupied by General Motors, which was the central topic of their 2009 Oscar-nominated documentary short The Last Truck: Closing of a GM Plant.

The Mandarin Chinese language portions of the film were facilitated by the inclusion of two Chinese filmmakers, Yiqian Zhang and Mijie Li, one or both of whom would travel to Ohio monthly. The directors credit these two as essential in providing a connection to the Chinese subjects depicted in the film.

Style 
The filmmakers implemented a fly-on-the-wall documentary filmmaking approach, in which no dialogue external to the subjects of the film is included, and the sounds of the factory and the dialogue of the workers is prioritized. In order to make focal such an audio/visual approach, the filmmakers implemented the use of lavalier microphones to effectively balance worker dialogue amid noise emanating from the factory's machinery. The voice-over narration provided by the factory workers was often recorded at their respective homes, independently from the factory setting. According to Bognar, implementing the film's narration in this way to create an effect of depicting a worker's inner monologue.

Reception 
After the film's screening at Sundance, it garnered wide acclaim. The site's consensus reads: "American Factory takes a thoughtful — and troubling — look at the dynamic between workers and employers in the 21st-century globalized economy." On Metacritic it has a weighted average score of 86 out of 100 based on 23 critics, indicating "universal acclaim".

David Edelstein of New York Magazine wrote: "It's a great, expansive, deeply humanist work, angry but empathetic to its core. It gestures toward the end of the working world we know – and to the rise of the machines."
Eric Kohn at IndieWire described it as "A fascinating tragicomedy about the incompatibility of American and Chinese industries."

The film won Best Documentary Feature at the 2020 Academy Awards as well as the Independent Spirit Award for the same category.

It also won the Primetime Emmy Award for Outstanding Directing for a Documentary/Nonfiction Program.

Accolades

See also
Detropia - 2012 documentary focused on the decline of the economy of Detroit due to long-term changes in the automobile industry
Roger & Me - 1989 Michael Moore documentary about General Motors closing its factory in Flint, Michigan, eliminating 35,000 jobs
Working-class culture

References

External links
 
 

2019 documentary films
2019 films
American documentary films
Primetime Emmy Award-winning broadcasts
Chinese-language American films
Documentary films about automobiles
Documentary films about globalization
Documentary films about labor relations in the United States
Films about the labor movement
Netflix original documentary films
Best Documentary Feature Academy Award winners
Sundance Film Festival award winners
Montgomery County, Ohio
Economy of Dayton, Ohio
Documentary films about Ohio
Higher Ground Productions films
Films directed by Steven Bognar and Julia Reichert
2010s English-language films
2010s Mandarin-language films
2010s American films
Films about companies